Valentine Jackson Chapman  (14 February 1910 – 5 December 1980) was a New Zealand botanist, university professor, and conservationist.

Biography
He was born in Alcester, Warwickshire, England, on 14 February 1910.

Chapman was an associate of Auckland's Mayor Dove-Myer Robinson and was a member of the Auckland Metropolitan Drainage Board between 1955 and 1956. He was a member of the Auckland City Council winning two by-elections in 1954 and 1961. Despite these successes, he was defeated in both subsequent elections in 1956 and 1962, missing out by only 172 votes in his second attempt.

In the 1974 New Year Honours, Chapman was appointed an Officer of the Order of the British Empire, for academic and public services. In 1977, he was awarded the Queen Elizabeth II Silver Jubilee Medal.

Chapman died on 5 December 1980.

Books by V.J.Chapman

Seaweeds and Their Uses, 1970

References

1910 births
1980 deaths
New Zealand conservationists
New Zealand academics
20th-century New Zealand botanists
English emigrants to New Zealand
People from Alcester
New Zealand Officers of the Order of the British Empire
Auckland City Councillors